Joseph-Félix Blanc (1872 - June 1962) was a French clergyman and bishop for the Roman Catholic Diocese of Tonga. He was born in Toulon. He was appointed bishop in 1912. He retired as Bishop in 1953, and returned to France. He died in June 1962 in Tonga.

References 

1872 births
1962 deaths
French Roman Catholic bishops
People from Toulon
Roman Catholic bishops of Tonga